The Ridges are an orchestral folk rock band from Athens, Ohio. The band is rooted in the collaboration of vocalist / guitarist Victor Rasgaitis and cellist / vocalist Talor Smith, who are frequently joined by a rotating cast of musicians.

History 
A collaboration between Victor Rasgaitis (guitar, vocals) and Talor Smith (cello, vocals), The Ridges formed at Ohio University in Athens, Ohio. The duo is supported live by a rotating cast of musicians adding classical and folk rock instruments ranging from cellos, violins, upright bass, and horns to banjo, mandolin, accordion, and drums. By augmenting their aggressive, high-energy performances with haunting, all-acoustic instrumentation, The Ridges craft their own unique brand of indie rock compositions. It’s a distinct sound that overflows with the dark romanticism of their ominous namesake — Athens' abandoned Victorian-style insane asylum where the band recorded their self-titled EP.

Known for bringing an electrifying energy to acoustic music, MidPoint Music Festival called them "a rootsier, catchier Arcade Fire," while Daytrotter.com described their sound as "the kind of Americana music that falls off the bone." It’s this unique duality that has found The Ridges just as comfortable sharing the stage with folk favorites like Ben Sollee, Jessica Lea Mayfield, and Horse Feathers, as when they're playing with indie rockers like Ra Ra Riot, Kishi Bashi, and Good Old War. A live band in every sense, they've honed their dynamic performance by supporting national headliners and independently touring the Midwest, East Coast, and South, while bringing stand-out showcases to Ohio's MidPoint Music Festival, New York City's CBGB Festival, and a total of 13 showcases at SXSW in Austin, TX.

Never satisfied with anything less than unforgettable, The Ridges are committed to finding new ways to surprise their fans with fresh ideas. From an in-theater live film score to a Record Store Day exclusive choral recording, The Ridges' passion for creatively customizing their definition of an indie band has gained them national momentum.

Performance Highlights 

The Ridges have notably performed with Ra Ra Riot, Kishi Bashi, Good Old War, Jessica Lea Mayfield, Ben Sollee, Horse Feathers, Mother Falcon, Ha Ha Tonka, Margot and the Nuclear So and So's, Cayucas, Miracles of Modern Science, The Soil & The Sun, Lucius, The Bright Light Social Hour, These United States, R. Ring, Those Darlins, Hrvrd, The David Mayfield Parade, Bad Veins, and The Seedy Seeds. In addition to 13 SXSW showcases and a CBGB Festival showcase, The Ridges have regularly performed "Critic's Pick" showcases at Cincinnati's MidPoint Music Festival. The Ridges have also recorded a Daytrotter Session, an Audiotree Live Session, a Threadless Warehouse Session, a Live from Bad Racket session, and produced The MidPoint Sessions.

Discography 

 2011 The Ridges EP

Track List
 The Insomniac's Song
 Overboard
 Not a Ghost
 Invented Love
 War Bonds

Other Releases 

 2011 Daytrotter Session (12/29/2011)
 2012 Record Store Day Release: The Insomniac's Song (Live with The Sleepless Singers)
 '2013 The Ridges Present: Nosferatu, A Symphony of Horror (Live Film Score)'''

External links 

 http://theridgesmusic.com
 http://theridges.bandcamp.com
 https://www.facebook.com/TheRidges
 https://twitter.com/The_Ridges
 https://www.youtube.com/RidgesBand
http://instagram.com/The_Ridges

American folk rock groups
Indie rock musical groups from Ohio
Musical groups from Appalachia
Musical groups from Athens, Ohio